The following is a list of episodes for the American animated television series Amphibia created by Matt Braly that premiered on Disney Channel on June 17, 2019. The series features the voices of Brenda Song, Justin Felbinger, Bill Farmer, Amanda Leighton, Anna Akana, Troy Baker, Haley Tju, and Keith David. A second season premiered on July 11, 2020, and a third and final season premiered on October 2, 2021 with the series ending on May 14, 2022.

Series overview

Episodes

Season 1 (2019)

Season 2 (2020–21)
Note: Episodes are listed by production order as provided by series creator Matt Braly for continuity reasons.

Season 3 (2021–22)

Shorts

Shorts overview

Teen Girl in a Frog World (2019)
A series of shorts began airing depicting Anne encountering oddities in Amphibia with the Plantars. All of the shorts were directed by Drew Applegate.

Wild Amphibia (2019)
In the style of nature documentaries, Soggy Joe introduces the viewer to a variety of strange creatures in Amphibia. After Soggy Joe is done reviewing each one, he will reveal a fictional promotion that is associated with him.

Chibi Tiny Tales (2020–23)

Disney began releasing new shorts titled Chibi Tiny Tales, as a loose follow-up to Big Hero 6: The Series' Big Chibi 6 The Shorts. Unlike Big Chibi 6, the shorts utilize silent comedy and slapstick in a super-deformed style reminiscient of anime. Other serialized Disney productions and Disney Channel films were also animated in this style.

Disney Theme Song Takeover (2020–21)
As part of a promotional campaign, Disney Channel began airing the Disney Theme Song Takeover wherein supporting characters from different shows performed the theme song to the series they were in. Unlike previous theme song takeovers, the first Amphibia Takeover video is instead an alternate arrangement instead of a supporting character singing it.

Vlogs from the Bog (2021)
A series of shorts featuring Anne showing off the interesting things in Amphibia. Chronologically, these shorts occur during the first season, though in "My Dope Life As A Battle Queen! By: Sasha", Sasha is shown to already be aware of who Sprig is and his relationship with Anne, information she would not find out until the end of the season.

Broken Karaoke (2022)
An infrequent series that features Disney Channel characters singing parodies of songs. While the segment typically features the cast of Big City Greens in the lead, there have been two that featured characters from Amphibia. Ironically, both episodes aired shortly after Amphibia's last episode.

Notes

References

Lists of American children's animated television series episodes
Lists of Disney Channel television series episodes
Amphibia (TV series)